The men's sabre was one of eight fencing events on the fencing at the 1972 Summer Olympics programme. It was the seventeenth appearance of the event. The competition was held from 30 to 31 August 1972. 53 fencers from 22 nations competed. Nations had been limited to three fencers each since 1928. The event was won by Viktor Sidyak of the Soviet Union, the nation's first victory in the event (tying the nation with Cuba, France, Greece, Italy, and Poland for second-most all-time, behind Hungary's 11). Hungary had lost its nine-Games gold medal streak in 1968 but remained a power in the event; Péter Marót took silver to extend Hungary's podium streak to 11 Games. Another Soviet, Vladimir Nazlymov, earned bronze.

Background

This was the 17th appearance of the event, which is the only fencing event to have been held at every Summer Olympics. All six of the finalists from 1968 returned: gold medalist (and 1956 bronze medalist and 1960 finalist) Jerzy Pawłowski, silver medalist Mark Rakita of the Soviet Union, bronze medalist (and 1964 gold medalist) Tibor Pézsa of Hungary, fourth-place finisher Vladimir Nazlymov of the Soviet Union, fifth-place finisher Rolando Rigoli of Italy, and sixth-place finisher Józef Nowara of Poland. The three world champions since the last Olympics were Viktor Sidyak of the Soviet Union (1969), Pézsa (1970), and Michele Maffei of Italy (1971). The field was thus crowded with top talent.

Hong Kong and Lebanon each made their debut in the men's sabre. Italy made its 15th appearance in the event, most of any nation, having missed the inaugural 1896 event and the 1904 St. Louis Games.

Competition format

After two Games of hybrid pool/knockout play, the 1972 tournament returned to an all-pool format, with each fencer facing the other fencers in the pool in a round robin. Bouts were to 5 touches. There were no barrages; ties were broken by touch quotient: touches scored divided by touches received. Unlike previous Games, all bouts were finished in the round robins. The 1972 format also eliminated the 8-fencer final pools of previous Games; for all rounds after the first, the number of fencers was set at 6.

There were five rounds:
 Round 1 (or "eliminating round"): The 54 fencers were divided into 9 pools, with 6 fencers each (though 1 fencer withdrew, so that pool had only 5). The top 4 fencers in each pool advanced; this narrowed the field from 53 to 36.
 Round 2 (or "1/8 finals"): The 36 fencers were divided into 6 pools of 6 fencers each. The top 4 fencers in each pool advanced, cutting the field from 36 to 24.
 Quarterfinals: With 24 fencers remaining, there were 4 pools of 6 fencers each. Now, only the top 3 in each pool advanced. This split the field in half, from 24 to 12.
 Semifinals: There were 2 pools of 6 fencers each. Again, only the top 3 advanced, resulting in a final pool of 6.
 Final: The final pool featured the remaining 6 fencers.

Schedule

All times are Central European Time (UTC+1)

Results

Round 1

Round 1 Pool A

Round 1 Pool B

Round 1 Pool C

Round 1 Pool D

Round 1 Pool E

Round 1 Pool F 

Skantze did not start.

Round 1 Pool G

Round 1 Pool H

Round 1 Pool I

Round 2

Round 2 Pool A

Round 2 Pool B

Round 2 Pool C 
Wischedit (0.889) and Orban (0.850) won the touch-quotient tiebreaker over Oldcorn (0.619) to advance.

Round 2 Pool D

Round 2 Pool E

Round 2 Pool F

Quarterfinals

Quarterfinal A

Quarterfinal B

Quarterfinal C

Quarterfinal D

Semifinals

Semifinal A

Semifinal B

Final 

The final resulted in a clear victory for Sidyak, but a three-way tie for second place. The tie was resolved by touch quotient (touches for divided by touches against), and the three fencers were very close. Marót had the best quotient (21/20, or 1.050) and took silver. Nazlymov had scored the same number of touches, but had been hit once more (21/21, or 1.000) and took bronze. Maffei had the same number of touches against as Nazlymov, but one fewer touch scored than the other two (20/21, or 0.952) and took fourth place.

Final classification

References

Sabre men
Men's events at the 1972 Summer Olympics